The Assassination of Waruhiu was the murder of Kenyan Chief Waruhiu by the Mau Maus on 7 October 1952. The Chief was a supporter of the Colonial British presence in Kenya and had been awarded the MBE. At Gachie, a location seven miles outside Nairobi, he was ambushed: shot in his car by three gunmen. A few days before his death Chief Waruhiu had condemned Mau Mau.  At his funeral, Governor Evelyn Baring called him "a great man, a great African and a great citizen of Kenya, who met his death in the service of his own people and his Government." His death helped contribute to the declaration of a state of emergency in Kenya two weeks later.

References

History of Kenya
Mau Mau Uprising
Assassinations in Kenya
October 1952 events in Africa
1952 murders in Kenya